Morocco women's national under-17 football team, also  nicknamed the Atlas Lionesses is a youth association football team operated under the auspices of Royal Moroccan Football Federation. Its primary role is the development of players in preparation for the senior Morocco women's national football team. In June 2022, The team qualified for the FIFA U-17 Women's World Cup which would be held in India, becoming the first North African side to qualify for the finals.

Fixtures and results

Legend

2022

Current squad
The following players were selected for the 2022 FIFA U-17 Women's World Cup.

Competitive record

FIFA U-17 Women's World Cup record

African U-17 Cup of Nations for Women record

Arab U-17 Women's Cup

See also
 Morocco women's national football team
 Morocco women's national under-20 football team

Notes

References

under-17
Women's national under-17 association football teams
Arabic women's national under-17 association football teams